Scoparia humilialis is a species of moth in the family Crambidae.  It is endemic to New Zealand.

Taxonomy
It was described by George Vernon Hudson in 1950. However the placement of this species within the genus Scoparia is in doubt. As a result, this species has also been referred to as Scoparia (s.l.) humilialis.

References

External links
 Image of S. humilialis 

Moths described in 1950
Moths of New Zealand
Scorparia
Endemic fauna of New Zealand
Taxa named by George Hudson
Endemic moths of New Zealand